Saldubella is a genus of flies in the family Stratiomyidae.

Species
Saldubella abdominalis James, 1977
Saldubella albipluma James, 1977
Saldubella brevis James, 1977
Saldubella diffusa James, 1977
Saldubella gressitti James, 1977
Saldubella hardyi James, 1977
Saldubella latimanus James, 1977
Saldubella longipennis James, 1977
Saldubella margaritifera Lindner, 1938
Saldubella missimensis James, 1977
Saldubella obliqua James, 1977
Saldubella pictipes James, 1977
Saldubella scutellaris James, 1977
Saldubella signatipennis Wulp, 1898
Saldubella tenuicornis James, 1977
Saldubella wauensis James, 1977
Saldubella yombae Kertész, 1916

References

Stratiomyidae
Brachycera genera
Taxa named by Kálmán Kertész
Diptera of Australasia